Karl Richard Korte (June 23,1928 – March 27, 2022) was an American composer of contemporary classical music.

He was born in Ossining, New York, and grew up in Englewood, New Jersey. He attended the Juilliard School, where he studied with Peter Mennin, William Bergsma, and Vincent Persichetti. He later studied composition with Otto Luening, Goffredo Petrassi, and Aaron Copland.

Korte taught at the University of Texas at Austin from 1971 to 1997 and held the rank of emeritus professor. From 1997 to 2000, he was a visiting professor at Williams College in Williamstown, Massachusetts. 

He received many national and international awards for his work, including two Guggenheim Fellowships (1959 and 1970), Fulbright Awards to Italy and to New Zealand, and a Gold Medal from the Belgian Government in the Queen Elisabeth Music Competition.

He died in Dobbs Ferry, New York.

Selected works
1957 – Fantasy for violin and piano
1964 – Songs of Innocence (Blake), for women's voices and piano
1967 – Matrix – 7 for woodwind quintet, piano and percussion. Written for the New York Woodwind Quintet
1968 – Aspects of Love, for SATB and piano
1968 – Sappho Says, for mezzo-soprano soloist with women's chorus, flute, and piano
1969 – Symphony No.3
1969 – Carols New Fashioned, for SATB and piano (optional guitar or harp)
1971 – Remembrances for flute and synthesized processed sound
1973 – Pale is This Good Prince (An Oratorio in memory of Jean Casadesus), for chorus, soprano, two pianos, percussion, and narrator
1982 – Music for a New Easter, for SATB chorus and brass or keyboard
1989 – Three Psalm Settings, for a cappella chorus
2000 – Viola Redux, Viola Dance for viola and piano (revised 2006)
2001 – Four Songs of Experience (Blake), for women's voices, SSA, and piano
2001 – Holy Thursday (Blake), for SATB and piano
2002 – SHIKI (the Four Seasons), for chorus (SATB or SSA), soloists, and accompaniment by an electronic score created from fragments of koto, percussion, and other sounds.
2004 – Travelogues for Duo46 (violin and guitar) and Cello (Cyprus, Te Maori, Aki)
2004 – 2 Makams for Duo46 (violin and guitar)
2005 – The Time Is: for SATB chorus, soloists, keyboard and strings. Six songs on texts ranging from the American Revolution to the Women's Suffrage Movement to contemporary settings on the subject of ecology by Eve Merriam.
2007 – "Virtual Voices" for Duo46 (violin and guitar) and tape

References

External links
Karl Korte official site
Collection of Korte correspondence

1928 births
2022 deaths
20th-century American composers
20th-century classical composers
21st-century American composers
21st-century classical composers
American classical composers
American male classical composers
Musicians from New Jersey
Musicians from New York (state)
Texas classical music
Juilliard School alumni
University of Texas at Austin faculty
Williams College faculty
People from Cambridge, New York
People from Englewood, New Jersey
People from Ossining, New York
Pupils of William Bergsma
Pupils of Aaron Copland
Pupils of Otto Luening
Pupils of Vincent Persichetti
Pupils of Goffredo Petrassi